The Ruth Anne Dodge Memorial, also known as the Black Angel, is a historic object located in Council Bluffs, Iowa, United States. This is the only work in Iowa by the American sculptor Daniel Chester French. The cast bronze sculpture stands along the edge of Fairview Cemetery as a tribute to Ruth Anne Dodge, the wife of railroad magnate Grenville M. Dodge. Its pedestal is a representation of a ship's prow with a garland swag, carved in pink marble. The pedestal, platform and reflecting pool is the work of New York architect Henry Bacon. The work was commissioned by Dodge's daughters Anne Dodge and Ella Dodge Pusey. It represents a recurring dream their mother had as she was dying of cancer. An angel with a bowl of water approached her and urged her to drink. During the third occurrence of the dream Mrs. Dodge took a drink and she died not long after. The sculpture was individually listed on the National Register of Historic Places in 1980. In 2007 it was included as a contributing property in the Lincoln-Fairview Historic District.

References

External links
 

 

1918 sculptures
Buildings and structures in Council Bluffs, Iowa
National Register of Historic Places in Pottawattamie County, Iowa
Monuments and memorials on the National Register of Historic Places in Iowa
Individually listed contributing properties to historic districts on the National Register in Iowa
Sculptures by Daniel Chester French
Monuments and memorials to women
Sculptures of angels
Ships in art
Cemetery art